A climate emergency declaration or declaring a climate emergency is an action taken by governments and scientists to acknowledge humanity is in a climate emergency. The first such declaration was made by a local government in December 2016. Since then over 2,100 local governments in 39 countries have made climate emergency declarations (as of May 2022). Populations covered by jurisdictions that have declared a climate emergency amount to over 1 billion citizens.

On 29 April 2019, the Welsh Government declared a climate emergency, which was subsequently passed by its parliament, the Senedd, on 1 May 2019, when it became the first in the world to officially declare a climate emergency.

Once a government makes a declaration, the next step for the declaring government is to set priorities to mitigate climate change, prior to ultimately entering a state of emergency or equivalent. In declaring a climate emergency, a government admits that climate change (or global warming) exists and that the measures taken up to this point are not enough to limit the changes brought by it. The decision stresses the need for the government and administration to devise measures that try to stop human-caused global warming.

The declarations can be made on different levels, for example, at a national or local government level, and they can differ in depth and detail in their guidelines. The term climate emergency does not only describe formal decisions, but also includes actions to avert climate breakdown. This is supposed to justify and focus the governing body towards climate action. The specific term emergency is used to assign priority to the topic, and to generate a mindset of urgency.

The term climate emergency has been promoted by climate activists and pro-climate action politicians to add a sense of urgency for responding to a long-term problem. A United Nations Development Programme survey of public opinion in 50 countries found that sixty-four percent of 1.2 million respondents believe climate change is a global emergency.

Terminology 
 For further discussion regarding terminology, see Climate crisis § Alternative terminology.

Climate emergency as a term was used in protests against climate change before 2010 (e.g. the "Climate-Emergency-Rally" in Melbourne in June 2009). In 2017 the city council of Darebin adopted multiple measures named "Darebin Climate Emergency Plan". On 4 December 2018, the Club of Rome presented their "Climate Emergency Plan", which included 10 high-priority measures to limit global warming. With the rise of movements like Extinction Rebellion and Fridays For Future the concern has been picked up by various governments.

Multiple European cities and communities who declared a climate emergency are simultaneously members of the Klima-Bündnis (German for climate alliance), which obligates them to lower their CO2 emissions by 10% every five years.

Oxford Dictionary chose climate emergency as the word of the year 2019 and defines the term as "a situation in which urgent action is required to reduce or halt climate change and avoid potentially irreversible environmental damage resulting from it." Usage of the term soared more than 10,000% between September 2018 and September 2019.

History

Early stages
Encouraged by the campaigners behind a Climate Emergency Declaration petition, which had been launched in Australia in May 2016, the first governmental declaration of a climate emergency in the world was put forward by Trent McCarthy, an Australian Greens Councillor at the City of Darebin in Melbourne, Australia. The city declared a climate emergency on 5 December 2016. In August 2017, Darebin decided upon a catalogue of actions in a "Darebin Climate Emergency Plan". Darebin's declaration was followed by Hoboken in New Jersey and Berkeley, California.

Hearing of these developments in 2018, UK Green Party politician Carla Denyer, then a member of Bristol City Council, took the lead role in bringing about Bristol City Council's declaration of a climate emergency. This was the first such declaration by in Europe, and has been widely credited as a breakthrough moment for cities and national parliaments beginning to declare climate emergency. Denyer's motion was described in the UK newspaper The Independent as 'the historic first motion' which by July 2019 had been 'copied by more than 400 local authorities and parliaments'.

On 28 April 2019, Nicola Sturgeon, First Minister of the Scottish Government, declared a climate emergency at the SNP conference; the Climate Change (Emissions Reduction Targets) (Scotland) Act was passed on 25 September 2019. The following day, the Welsh Government declared a climate emergency, which was subsequently passed by its parliament, the Senedd, on 1 May 2019, when it became the first in the world to officially declare a climate emergency.  The Parliament of the United Kingdom followed later that afternoon.

Subsequent developments
Pope Francis declared a climate emergency in June 2019. The Pope also called for a "radical energy transition" away from fossil fuels towards renewable energy sources, and urged leaders to "hear the increasingly desperate cries of the earth and its poor." He also argued against "the continued search for new fossil fuel reserves" and stated that "fossil fuels should remain underground."

On 10 July 2019, networks representing more than 7,000 higher and further education institutions from six continents announced that they are declaring a Climate Emergency, and agreed to undertake a three-point plan to address the crisis through their work with students. Some statements were criticized for not including specific measures.

In June 2019, Councillor Trent McCarthy of the City of Darebin brought together councillors and parliamentarians in Australia and around the world for two online link-ups to connect the work of climate emergency-declared councils and governments. Following these link-ups and a successful motion at the National General Assembly of Local Government, McCarthy announced the formation of Climate Emergency Australia, a new network of Australian governments and councils advocating for a climate emergency response.

Representative Earl Blumenauer of Oregon believes the US government should declare a climate emergency. Blumenauer's proposed legislation is supported by 2020 US presidential candidate and Senator Bernie Sanders, as well as Congresswoman Alexandria Ocasio-Cortez.

In 2019, according to an eight-country poll, a majority of the public recognise the climate crisis as an "emergency" and say politicians are failing to tackle the problem, backing the interests of Big Oil over the wellbeing of ordinary people. The survey found that climate breakdown is viewed as the most important issue facing the world in seven out of the eight countries surveyed.

In September 2013, the Australian Medical Association officially declared climate change a public health emergency. The AMA noted that climate change will cause "higher mortality and morbidity from heat stress, injury and mortality from increasingly severe weather events; increases in the transmission of vector-borne diseases; food insecurity resulting from declines in agricultural outputs; [and] a higher incidence of mental-ill health." The AMA has called on the Australian Government to adopt a carbon budget; reduce emissions; and transition from fossil fuels to renewable energy, among other proposals to mitigate the health impacts of climate change. Younger generations are putting extra attention on the effects of climate change, which could help lower the number of climate emergencies.

The Australian Greens Party have called on the federal Parliament to declare a climate emergency. Greens MP for Melbourne, Adam Bandt, welcomed the UK Parliament's declaration of a climate emergency and argued that Australia should follow their lead. In October 2019, an official e-petition to the Australian Parliament calling for the declaration of a climate emergency, received more than 400,000 signatories. This is the single most popular online Parliamentary petition in Australia. Former federal Liberal Party leader John Hewson has publicly urged for a conscience vote in the Parliament on the climate emergency, despite the Liberal Party's current position on climate change. He also stated that "it was an emergency 30 years ago".

In October 2019, the Australian Labor Party supported the Greens Party's policy to declare a climate emergency, however the proposition failed with the rejection of the Morrison Government. The motion was supported by independent members Zali Steggall, Helen Haines and Andrew Wilkie, as well as Centre Alliance.

On 5 November 2019, the journal BioScience published an article endorsed by further 11,000 scientists from 153 nations, that states Climate Emergency ("We declare clearly and unequivocally that planet Earth is facing a climate emergency") and that the world's people face "untold suffering due to the climate crisis" unless there are major transformations to global society. On 28 July 2021, BioScience published another article, stating, that more than 2,800 additional scientists have signed that declaration; and that in addition, 1,990 jurisdictions in 34 countries have formally declared or recognized a climate emergency.

In November 2019, the Oxford Dictionaries made the term climate emergency word of the year.

On 14–15 February 2020 the first National Climate Emergency Summit was held at the city hall in Melbourne, Australia. It was a sold-out event with 2,000 attendees and 100 speakers.

In December 2020, New Zealand declared a climate emergency. After winning reelection, Prime Minister Jacinda Ardern's majority Labour government invited the Greens to participate in a "cooperation agreement", and worked with the Minister for Climate James Shaw in declaring a climate emergency.

As of December 2020, five years after the Paris Agreement, at least 15 countries have already declared a state of climate emergency, including Japan and New Zealand. (Note: The fact that councils in 34 countries have declared is not the same as that these countries' national governments have declared.) The Secretary-General of the United Nations António Guterres has urged all other countries to declare climate emergencies until carbon neutrality is reached. Due to the COVID-19 Pandemic, health care workers have put less effort into planetary wellness, which will put more of a strain on the Earth leading to more climate emergencies.

In September 2021, Mauritius joined the list of countries calling for a State of Climate Emergency. The recommendation was made by the National Youth Environment (NYEC) Chairperson, Dr. Zaheer Allam, and announced by the Environment Minister, Kavy Ramano, after the first sitting of the Interministerial Council on Climate Change. A novel approach has been introduced which involves analyzing past society's and how they have dealt with other types of disasters.

Recent development: list of countries and dependencies

Parliamentary or Government declaration 
 Scotland (28 April 2019 – Nicola Sturgeon)
 Wales (29 April 2019 – Parliament)
 United Kingdom (1 May 2019 – Parliament)
 Jersey (2 May 2019)
 Republic of Ireland (9 May 2019)
 Isle of Man (10 May 2019 – Government, 18 June 2019 – Parliament)
 Portugal (7 June 2019)
 Holy See (June 2019)
 Canada (17 June 2019)
 France (27 June 2019)
 Argentina (17 July 2019)
 Spain (17 September 2019 – Parliament, 21 January 2020 – Government)
 Austria (25 September 2019)
 Malta (22 October 2019)
 Bangladesh (13 November 2019)
 Italy (12 December 2019)
 Andorra (23 January 2020)
 Maldives (12 February 2020)
 South Korea (24 September 2020)
 Japan (20 November 2020)
 New Zealand (2 December 2020)
 Singapore (1 February 2021)
 Hawaii (29 April 2021 – State Legislature)
 Mauritius (28 September 2021)

European Union member states 
On 28 November 2019, the European Parliament declared a climate emergency. The EU represented at that date 28 member states: Austria, Belgium, Bulgaria, Croatia, Cyprus, Czech Republic, Denmark, Estonia, Finland, France, Germany, Greece, Hungary, Ireland, Italy, Latvia, Lithuania, Luxembourg, Malta, Netherlands, Poland, Portugal, Romania, Slovakia, Slovenia, Spain, Sweden and the United Kingdom.

Countries and jurisdictions that have declared Climate Emergency 

There is currently not any established international body keeping a record of which jurisdictions have declared a climate emergency. CEDAMIA a group advocating for climate emergency has the most complete list of jurisdictions including national, state and local jurisdictions across the world that have declared a climate emergency, this list is constantly being updated as more jurisdictions declare.

Criticism 
Declaring a climate emergency has been criticized for giving the idea of a need for authoritarian and anti-democratic policies, with critics saying democracy is essential for the long-term success of climate policies.

See also
 Climate change in New York City
 Climate crisis
 Carbon neutrality
 Securitization (international relations) 
 World Scientists' Warning to Humanity
 Extinction Rebellion
 School Strike for Climate

References

Further reading

External links
 Climate Emergency Declaration – Call to declare a climate emergency and list of declarations by country
 CEDAMIA - Climate Emergency Declaration and Mobilisation In Action - Global Declarations List
 CACE - Council and community Action in the Climate Emergency Declaration

Emergency declaration
Emergency declaration
2010s neologisms